This is a list of Dutch television related events from 1986.

Events
Unknown - Gina De Wit, performing as Linda Ronstadt wins the second series of Soundmixshow

Births
15 March - Stacey Rookhuizen, TV personality
30 June - Jamai Loman, singer & TV presenter
23 December - Anna-Alicia Sklias, TV presenter & dancer

Deaths
5 August - Willem Ruis, game show presenter